Ilya Piatetski-Shapiro (Hebrew: איליה פיאטצקי-שפירו; ; 30 March 1929 – 21 February 2009) was a Soviet-born Israeli mathematician. During a career that spanned 60 years he made major contributions to applied science as well as pure mathematics. In his last forty years his research focused on pure mathematics; in particular, analytic number theory, group representations and algebraic geometry. His main contribution and impact was in the area of automorphic forms and L-functions.

For the last 30 years of his life he suffered from Parkinson's disease.  However, with the help of his wife Edith, he was able to continue to work and do mathematics at the highest level, even when he was barely able to walk and speak.

Moscow years: 1929–1959
Ilya was born in 1929 in Moscow, Soviet Union. Both his father, Iosif Grigor'evich, and mother, Sofia Arkadievna, were from traditional Jewish families, but which had become assimilated. His father was from Berdichev, a small city in the Ukraine, with a largely Jewish population. His mother was from Gomel, a similar small city in Belorussia. Both parents' families were middle-class, but they sank into poverty after the October revolution of 1917.

Ilya became interested in mathematics at the age of 10, struck, as he wrote in his short memoir, "by the charm and unusual beauty of negative numbers", which his father, a PhD in chemical engineering, showed him.

In 1952, Piatetski-Shapiro won the Moscow Mathematical Society Prize for a Young Mathematician for work done while still an undergraduate at Moscow University. His winning paper<ref>{{cite journal|last=Pyateckiĭ-Šapiro|first=I.I.|title=Supplement to the work "On the problem of uniqueness of expansion of a function in a trigonometric series.|journal=Moskov. Gos. Univ. Uč. Zap. Mat.|year=1954|volume=165|issue=7|pages=79–97}}</ref> contained a solution to the problem of the French analyst Raphaël Salem on sets of uniqueness of trigonometric series. The award was especially remarkable because of the atmosphere of strong anti-Semitism in Soviet Union at that time.

Despite the award, and a very strong recommendation by his mentor Alexander O. Gelfond, a professor of mathematics at Moscow University and an important Communist Party member (Gelfond’s father was a friend of Lenin), Piatetski-Shapiro’s application to graduate program at Moscow University was rejected. Ilya was ultimately admitted to the Moscow Pedagogical Institute, where he received his Ph.D. in 1954 under the direction of Alexander Buchstab. His early work was in classical analytic number theory. This includes his paper on what is now known as the Piatetski-Shapiro prime number theorem, which states that, for 1 ≤ c ≤ 12/11, the number of integers 1 ≤ n ≤ x for which the integer part of nc is prime is asymptotically x / c log x as x → ∞.

After leaving the Moscow Pedagogical Institute, he spent a year at the Steklov Institute, where he received the advanced Doctor of Sciences degree, also in 1954, under the direction of Igor Shafarevich. His contact with Shafarevich, who was a professor at the Steklov Institute, broadened Ilya's mathematical outlook and directed his attention to modern number theory and algebraic geometry. This led, after a while, to the influential joint paper   in which they proved a Torelli theorem for K3 surfaces.

Moscow years: 1960s
Ilya's career was on the rise, and in 1958 he was made a professor of mathematics at the Moscow Institute of Applied Mathematics, where he introduced Siegel domains. By the 1960s, he was recognized as a  star mathematician. In 1965 he was appointed to an additional professorship at the prestigious Moscow State University. He conducted seminars for advanced students, among them Grigory Margulis (now at Yale) and David Kazhdan (now at Hebrew University). Ilya's reputation spread internationally.  He was invited to attend 1962 International Congress of Mathematicians in Stockholm, but was not allowed to go by Soviet authorities (Shafarevich, also invited, presented his talk). In 1966, Ilya was again invited to ICM in Moscow  where he presented a 1-hour lecture on Automorphic Functions and arithmetic groups (Автоморфные функции и арифметические группы).

But despite his fame, Ilya was not allowed to travel abroad to attend meetings or visit colleagues except for one short trip to Hungary. The Soviet authorities insisted on one condition: become a party member, and then you can travel anywhere you want. Ilya gave his famous answer: “The membership in the Communist Party will distract me from my work.”

During the span of his career Piatetski-Shapiro was influenced greatly by Israel Gelfand. The aim of their collaboration was to introduce novel representation theory into classical modular forms and number theory. Together with Graev, they wrote the classic “Automorphic Forms and Representations” book.

These efforts stand among Ilya’s most important works. His research then and later was marked by brilliance, originality, and deep insight.

Refusenik period and emigration to Israel
During the early 1970s, a growing number of Soviet Jews were permitted to emigrate to Israel. The anti-Jewish behavior in the Soviet Union, however, was not enough to make Ilya want to leave his country. What shook him to the core was the difficulty of maintaining a Jewish identity and the enforced conformity to communism around him in the scientific community. He didn’t wish this future for his son, sixteen at the time.

Piatetski-Shapiro lost his part-time position at math dept of MGU (Moscow State University) in 1973 after he signed a letter asking Soviet authorities to release a dissident mathematician Alexander Esenin-Volpin from a mental institution. Many other mathematicians who signed the letter (including Shafarevich) also lost their part-time positions.

After his ex-wife and son left the Soviet Union in 1974, Ilya also applied for an exit visa to Israel and was refused (curiously: his ex-wife and son were also refused, even though they were already in Israel).

After applying for emigration in 1974, Ilya lost his research position at the Moscow Institute of Applied Mathematics (IPM). Authorities refused to grant Ilya an exit visa, claiming that he was too valuable a scientist to be allowed to leave. As a refusenik, he lost access to mathematical libraries and other academic resources. He continued his researches nevertheless, and colleagues took books from the library for him.

As a prominent refusenik with connections to an international scientific community, Ilya was followed around by a KGB car and his apartment was under electronic surveillance. He conducted his meetings with friends and colleagues by writing on a plastic board, especially when he needed to communicate about his situation. His plight as a mathematician, with serious restrictions on his researches and without means for survival, attracted much attention in the U.S. and Europe.

In 1976, a presentation was made to the Council of the National Academy of Sciences urging the use of their good offices to get Ilya an exit visa. Later that year, Ilya obtained an exit visa. His second marriage ended as his then-current wife remained in Moscow.  He visited colleagues all over the world who had signed petitions and fought for his freedom before going to Israel. He was welcomed warmly upon arrival in Israel and accepted a professorship at Tel Aviv University. He was elected into Israel Academy of Sciences and Humanities in 1978.

After leaving Soviet  Union, Ilya also visited US in 1976 and spent a semester as a visiting professor at University of Maryland.

Yale and converse theorem
Starting in 1977, Ilya divided his time between Tel Aviv University and Yale, directing doctoral dissertations in both places. One of his major works at Yale dealt with the converse theorem which establishes a link between automorphic forms on n by n matrix groups and zeta functions.

For n = 1 this theorem is classical. The assertion for n = 2 was proved by André Weil, and the novel version for n = 3 was conceived by Piatetski-Shapiro while he was still a refusenik in the Soviet Union.  It took another 25 years and works with other collaborators, in particular his student James Cogdell, before the suitably flexible and powerful general case was completed.

The converse theorem has played a role in many of the results known in the direction of the principle of functoriality of Langlands.

Last years
Ilya showed great strength in battling Parkinson's disease for the last 30 years of his life.  His condition worsened in the last 10 years to the point where he was barely able to move and speak, but thanks to extraordinary love and care of his wife Edith, Ilya was still able to travel to many mathematical conferences and keep mathematical contacts.  With the help of James Cogdell he was able to continue at the highest level of research until almost his last days.

Ilya was an amateur chess player and loved playing chess with his children. In the last 10 years, when it became difficult for him to move and even speak, he still played chess and checkers as a way of communicating with them, and sometimes was even winning.

Ilya was married 3 times and had a son, Gregory I. Piatetsky-Shapiro and daughters, Vera Lipkin and Shelly Shapiro Baldwin.

Awards and honours
Piatetski-Shapiro was elected to the Israel Academy of Sciences and Humanities in 1978, was a Guggenheim Fellow for the academic year 1992–1993, and was the recipient of numerous prizes, including:
 In 1981, the Israel Prize, for mathematics; and
 In 1990, the Wolf Prize for Mathematics.
 In 2020, the Jerusalem Post listed Piatetski-Shapiro as one of the Russian-speaking Jews who shaped Israel. It notes that along with colleague James Cogdell, Piatetski-Shapiro developed the Converse Theorem, which finds some deep relationships between different fields of mathematics.

He was invited to address the quadrennial International Mathematical Congress — one of the highest mathematical honors — 4 times: 1962, 1966 (gave plenary address), 1978 (presented 45 minute talk), and 2002.

See also
List of Israel Prize recipients

Further reading
J. W. Cogdell and I. I. Piatetski-Shapiro (1990), The Arithmetic and Spectral Analysis of Poincaré Series.  Perspectives in Mathematics, Vol. 13.  Academic Press. ; 2014 pbk reprint
 
James Cogdell, Simon Gindikin, and Peter Sarnak, editors (2000), Selected Works of Ilya Piatetski-Shapiro.  American Mathematical Society.  
I. I. Piatetski-Shapiro (1983), Complex representations of GL(2,K) for finite fields K''.  Contemporary Mathematics, Vol. 16.  American Mathematical Society.  
I. I. Piatetski-Shapiro, "Automorphic functions and the geometry of classical domains", Gordon and Breach, 1969

References

External links

 
 Gregory Piatetsky-Shapiro memorial page for Ilya Piatetski-Shapiro - share your memories there
 Boston Globe Obituary, Mar 6, 2009
 Yale Math Dept Obituary for Ilya Piatetski-Shapiro, Feb 2009
 American Mathematical Society  Obituary for Ilya Piatetski-Shapiro, Feb 2009
 Tel Aviv University On The Life And Work Of Ilya Piatetski-Shapiro, Mar 2009
 Tel Aviv University  Obituary for Prof. Ilya Piatetski-Shapiro, (in Hebrew), Feb 2009
 Avzel blog entry Ilya Iosifovich Piatetski-Shapiro (in Russian), Feb 2009
 
 
 Conference in Honor of Dan Mostow and Ilya Piatetski-Shapiro, Apr 1999

1929 births
2009 deaths
20th-century  Israeli mathematicians
21st-century  Israeli mathematicians
Soviet mathematicians
Israeli people of Belarusian-Jewish descent
Israel Prize in mathematics recipients
Members of the Israel Academy of Sciences and Humanities
Russian Jews
Academic staff of Tel Aviv University
Wolf Prize in Mathematics laureates
Yale University faculty
Scientists from Moscow